Neocrepidodera basalis is a species of flea beetle from a leaf beetle family that is endemic to Italy.

References

Beetles described in 1900
Beetles of Europe
basalis
Endemic fauna of Italy